Chervona Ruta is a permanent biennial all-Ukrainian youth festival of contemporary song and popular music, which has been held every two years since 1989. It was a benchmark where more Ukrainian popular music was presented transitioning away from traditional Ukrainian folk culture associated with "sharovary" genre. Unlike the Soviet festival Song of the Year (Pesnya goda) where only a selected song from Ukraine sometimes was demonstrated, Chervona Ruta allowed more singers and songs.

The festival is dedicated to a Ukrainian songwriter, composer and poet Volodymyr Ivasyuk who is the author and composer of the widely popular Ukrainian song Chervona Ruta. The name may refer to a mythological or actual species of flowering plants Chervona ruta.

History 
The idea and the name of the festival belongs to journalist Ivan Lepsha, which was realized by Taras Melnyk, Kyrylo Stetsenko, Anatoliy Kalenychenko, Oleh Repetskyi and Ivan Malkovych. The festival played an important role in the revival of Ukrainian popular music and contributed to the Ukrainian music boom of the 90s.

Until start of the Soviet reforms such "perestroika" (The Reform) in 1986 along with "Glasnost" and "Uskoreniye", the rock music throughout the Soviet Union was a taboo. But, there were some exclusions such as the 1980 Georgian "Spring Rhythms". There was saying that today you play the jazz (implying any music of the capitalist West created by negroes, according to the Great Soviet Encyclopedia) and tomorrow you will sell your Homeland.

The first festival - Chernivtsi 1989 
The first Chervona Ruta festival was held on September 17–24, 1989 in Chernivtsi at Bukovyna Stadium. While the festival was conducted under close supervision of the republican KDB (the Ukrainian branch of KGB), militsiya, and Communist Party of Ukraine, the Ukrainian anthem "Shche ne vmerla" was performed at the festival, and blue and yellow flags were unfurled. Famous bands «Vopli Vidoplyasova», «Braty Hadyukiny», «Kvartyra № 50», «Zymovyy sad», Vika Vradiy, Marichka Burmaka, Tryzuby Stas, and many others participated in rock competitions. In total, there were over 500 performers, including singers from Europe and North America. The festival organizers and jury members were overwhelmed by the sheer number of contestants and the quality of their performances. There was a song to commemorate Volodymyr Ivasyuk who was murdered 10 years before.

The final concert opened with sounds of trembitas, a Ukrainian elongated highland horn. People in the crowd carried symbols of the Ukrainian SSR such as the state emblem of the Ukrainian SSR and the state flag of the Ukrainian SSR, and a large bonfire was started on the playing field.

The festival's grand prize was received by Vasyl Zhdankin, other laureates included "Sestrychka Vika" (Vika Vradiy), "Komu vnyz", "Braty Hadiukiny", Eduard Drach, Viktor Morozov, Taras Kurchyk, Andriy Mykolaichuk, and others. It  was Kuban native Zhdankin who spontaneously started to sing the Ukrainian anthem at the festival's closing.

At the final concert, which took place at the central stadium of Chernivtsi, local police cracked down on any manifestations of "nationalism", detaining young girls (many from the popular "Lion Society") who were dressed in yellow blouses and blue skirts. At the stadium Georgi Gongadze was attacked and hit on the head by militsiya.

Rosmay Media Center has made a 6-part film about the history of the festival.

Chernivtsi 2019 
Chervona Ruta was held on September 17–22 again in Chernivtsi (hometown of Volodymyr Ivasyuk). It was 30th Anniversary of the Festival.

Impact 
Ruta Fest made a real "revolution" in Ukrainian culture, which impacted wider society. The festival gave birth to new youth music that had not existed before. Previously, Ukrainian youth, without domestic idols, had to settle for variety shows from Moscow, or listen to Western pop stars. Many of the songs performed for the first time at the festival immediately became hits, popular with millions of people. The winners of "Ruta-89" and their songs were the top performers in many  charts and polls. Musicians who were relatively obscure only days previously turned into Ukrainian youth idols overnight. For the first time, a large part of the population, and especially young people, began to admire Ukrainian music, which became part of their lives.

Chervona Ruta also launched a national show business in Ukraine. It was Ruta who became the first customer for the technical (stage, sound, light, recording studios, music equipment, reproduction of music production) and creative (composers, arrangers, sound producers, poets, etc.) support such events. During the first Ruta Fest the festival records were sold out and did not satisfy even a tenth of the demand. And after the festival was held the first ever Ukrainian concert tour: 87 concerts of the winners of "Ruth-89" all over Ukraine were held with unprecedented success in crowded halls. The music of the festival began to gather huge audiences in the hundreds of thousands of spectators at the stadiums and large squares attracted by the artistic value of the concerts (previously, so many people only gathered for political rallies).

See also
 Jurmala Young Pop Singer Competition
 Volodymyr Ivasyuk
 Singing Revolution

References

External links 
 Ukrainian President to attend jubilee concert of 'Chervona Ruta-20" festival in Chernivtsi  - The National Radio Company of Ukraine
 fun.te.ua
 http://chervonaruta.info/
 Фестиваль «Червона рута-1989». Приватна зйомка Kevin Smith. YouTube.
 The ten years that shocked (10 років, що потрясли). YouTube. (6 episodes). 28 October 2015
 The festival "Chervona Ruta–1981" (Фестиваль «Червона рута-1989»). Chas (Chernivtsi). 17 September 2018
 To remember everything. The 1989 Chervona Ruta. The forerunner of independence (Згадати Все. Червона Рута 1989. Передвісник незалежності). 24 TV (Ukraine). 13 July 2017

Music festivals in Ukraine
Music festivals in the Soviet Union
Biennial events
Music festivals established in 1989
Annual events in Ukraine
Annual events in the Soviet Union
Ukrainian independence movement